Thamrin Nine is a mixed-use development complex in Jakarta, Indonesia. It covers an area of approximately 570,000 square metres with office, retail, residential, hotels, sports and entertainment facilities. Its centrepiece, the Autograph Tower (382.9 m), is the tallest building in the Southern Hemisphere. The complex will have three office and apartment towers with a retail podium that connects the towers. The developer of the complex is PT Putragaya Wahana (PGW), who is also the developer of adjacent UOB Plaza.

Autograph Tower
Construction of Thamrin Nine Tower 1, which is named as Autograph Tower, topped off in October 2020, making Autograph Tower the first supertall building in Indonesia. It is one of the twin paired towers, the lower four floors of which will be linked by retail podium. The architectural height of the tower 1 is 385 meters. The tower has 75 floors above and 6 floors below the ground. There is a three-storey observation deck at floor 56–58 and a Sky Garden area at the tower. The tower is designed by Kohn Pedersen Fox Associates. The lower floors of the tower are for office, whereas the upper floors will be occupied by Waldorf Astoria Hotel. It is a class A, green skyscraper with platinum certification and uses up to 30% less energy compared to a conventionally-constructed tower of the same scale. The Autograph Tower is the tallest building in the Southern Hemisphere, surpassing the Q1 Tower in Australia, at 322.5 m.

Luminary Tower
Tower 2 is named as Luminary Tower. The tower will have 62 floors with a helipad and observation deck, making it a skyscraper 304 meters tall. This tower will house a five star Pan Pacific Hotel, four star Park Royal Hotel and Park Royal Serviced Suits. As of December 2022, Luminary Tower is still not operational. 

The apartment towers block of the complex is named Le Parc and consists of three buildings.

Third tower
The third tower which is not named yet, will be multifunctional property that will offices, apartments, and also a hotel.

Current developments 

 Le Parc Residence at Thamrin Nine
 Retail Podium
 Autograph Tower
 Luminary Tower

Portfolio 

 UOB Plaza
 Chubb Square
 Thamrin Nine Ballroom
 Food Parc
 Indosurya Tower
 Gedung Cokro 88
 Gedung Putih Sungai Gerong

See also

 List of tallest buildings in Jakarta
 Jalan M.H. Thamrin

References

External links
 Building at The Skyscraper Center database 

Buildings and structures in Jakarta
Post-independence architecture of Indonesia
Towers in Indonesia
Skyscrapers in Indonesia
Skyscraper office buildings in Indonesia
Skyscraper hotels
Central Jakarta